Armundo Dreisbach "A.D." Condo (September 19, 1872 in Freeport, Illinois – 24 August 1956 in Albany, California) was an American cartoonist best known as the creator of the comic strip The Outbursts of Everett True.

History
Condo first joined the newspaper industry in the 1880s, working as a printer's devil. In 1896, the Toledo News hired him as an editorial cartoonist as a direct response to the William Jennings Bryan presidential campaign. He subsequently worked for the Cleveland Press, and was then contracted to the Press's owner, the Newspaper Enterprise Association, where he created The Outbursts of Everett True.

Other works
Condo's other works included "Diana Dillpickles", "Osgar und Adolf" (1911-1915, ethnic humor), and "Mr. Skygack, from Mars" (1907-1912, often described as the first science fiction comic strip).

The last comic strip to feature Condo's byline was published in 1946.

References

American cartoonists
American comics artists
1872 births
1956 deaths